Gottasecca is a comune (municipality) in the Province of Cuneo in the Italian region Piedmont, located about  southeast of Turin and about  east of Cuneo.

Gottasecca borders the following municipalities: Cairo Montenotte, Camerana, Castelletto Uzzone, Dego, Monesiglio, Prunetto, and Saliceto.

References 

Cities and towns in Piedmont